Máximo González and Juan Mónaco were the defending champions, but González chose not to participate this year.
Mónaco partnered with Pablo Cuevas, but they lost in the second round against Victor Hănescu and Horia Tecău.
František Čermák and Michal Mertiňák won in the final 6–4, 6–3, against Marcel Granollers and Tommy Robredo.

Seeds

Draw

External links
 Doubles main draw

Doubles